Stephen "Steve" Rule (born 5 June 1952) is an English-born former rugby union and professional rugby league footballer who played in the 1970s and 1980s, and current rugby union coach.

Background
Steve Rule was born in Bebington, Cheshire, England.

Playing career

International honours
Steve Rule won a cap for Wales (RL) while at Salford in 1981, qualifying through his grandparents who were born in Aberdare.

Rugby union achievements
Steve Rule won the Universities Athletic Union, Old Belvedere, Bridgend and Glasgow Rugby sevens tournaments with Loughborough Students RUFC in 1973, and represented England in the Bermuda Classic Tournament in 1989.

Career records
Until extended to 14-goals by Steve Blakeley in 2003, Steve Rule jointly held Salford's "Most goals in a game" record with 13-goals scored against Doncaster on 4 September 1981, with Gus Risman and David Watkins.

Outside of rugby
Steve Rule retired from playing rugby in 1985 following a neck injury, and currently works as Head of the Pupil Referral Service at Wigan Council.

References

External links
Prolfile at saints.org.uk
Photograph 'Steve Rule – Centenary Match 14–10–79 Salford 14 – 14 Widnes' at flickr.com

1952 births
Living people
English rugby league players
English rugby union coaches
English rugby union players
Footballers who switched code
Loughborough Students RUFC players
Lymm RFC players
New Brighton F.C. players
Rugby league fullbacks
Rugby league players from Wirral
Rugby union fly-halves
Rugby union players from Merseyside
Sale Sharks coaches
Sale Sharks players
Salford Red Devils players
St Helens R.F.C. players
Wales national rugby league team players